Modane is a railway station located in Modane, Savoie, France. The station was opened on 17 September 1871 and is located on the Culoz–Modane railway. The train services are operated by SNCF.

On 10 September 2017, Turin metropolitan railway service extended Line SFM3 to Modane. This service is only offered on Sundays and public holidays.

Train services
The station is served by the following services:

High speed services (TGV) Paris - Chambéry - Turin - Milan
High speed services (TGV) Paris - Chambéry - Modane
Regional services (TER Auvergne-Rhône-Alpes) Chambéry - Modane

References

Railway stations in Savoie
Railway stations in France opened in 1871